Fréjus is a commune in the Var department in the Provence-Alpes-Côte d'Azur region in Southeastern France. In 2019, it had a population of 54,458.

It neighbours Saint-Raphaël, effectively forming one urban agglomeration. The north of the commune forms part of the Massif de l'Esterel. On 2 December 1959, the Malpasset Dam, on the Reyran River above the city of Fréjus, ruptured, killing over 400 people.

History

The origins of Frejus probably lie with the Celto-Ligurian people who settled around the natural harbour of Aegytna. The remains of a defensive wall are still visible on Mont Auriasque and Cap Capelin. The Phocaeans of Marseille later established an outpost on the site.

Foundation
Frejus was strategically situated at an important crossroads formed by the Via Julia Augusta (which ran between Italy and the Rhône) and the Via Domitia. Although there are only few traces of a settlement at that time, it is known that the poet Cornelius Gallus was born there in 67 BC.

Julius Caesar wanted to supplant Massalia and he founded the city as Forum Julii meaning 'market of Julius'. Tacitus also named its port claustra maris (gateway to sea).

The exact date of the founding of Forum Julii is uncertain, but it was certainly before 43 BC since it appears in the correspondence between Plancus and Cicero and 49 BC is most likely.

Roman city

It was at Forum Julii that Octavius repatriated the galleys taken from Mark Antony at the Battle of Actium in 31 BC. Between 29 and 27 BC, it became a colony for his veterans of the 8th legion, adding the suffix Octavanorum Colonia.

Augustus made the city the capital of the new province of Narbonensis in 22 BC, spurring rapid development. It became one of the most important ports in the Mediterranean; its port was the only naval base for the Roman fleet of Gaul and only the second port after Ostia until at least the time of Nero.

Subsequently, under Tiberius, the major monuments and amenities still visible today were constructed: the amphitheatre, the aqueduct, the lighthouse, the baths and the theatre. Forum Julii had impressive walls of 3.7 km length that protected an area of 35 hectares. There were about six thousand inhabitants. The territory of the city, the civitas forojuliensis, extended from Cabasse in the west to Fayence and Mons in the north.

It became an important market town for craft and agricultural production. Agriculture developed with villa rusticas such as at Villepey and Saint-Raphaël. Mining of green sandstone and blue porphyry and fish farming contributed to the thriving economy.

In 40 AD Gnaeus Julius Agricola, who later completed the Roman conquest of Britain, was born in Forum Julii. He was father-in-law of the historian Tacitus, whose biography of Agricola mentions that Forum Julii was an "ancient and illustrious colony". The city was also mentioned several times in the writings of Strabo and Pliny the Elder.

In early 69 the Battle of Forum Julii was fought between the armies of the rival emperors Otho and Vitellius. The exact location of this battle is not known, but afterwards Vitellius retreated to Antipolis.

The 4th century saw the creation of the Diocese of Fréjus, France's second largest after that of Lyon; the building of the first church is attested in 374 with the election of a bishop. Saint-Léonce became Bishop of Fréjus in 433 and wrote:
"From 374, at the Council of Valencia, a bishop was appointed in Frejus, but he never came. I was the first of the bishops of that city. I was able to build the first Cathedral with its Baptistery."

The decay of Rome led to that of the cities of its empire.

Monuments
The richest architecture belongs to the Roman city whose many buildings make it the richest concentration of this period in France after Arles. The most notable are the amphitheatre, the aqueduct from Mons, Var, as well as the theatre.

In addition the old town is home to many other impressive remains, city walls, the two gates (of Rome, of Reyran), the square of Agricola with the gate of the Gauls, an exedra and the platform with a cistern on the Butte Saint-Antoine, the paving of the via Aurelia which passed through the city,  the remains of the ancient harbour with the remains of the north quay, the lighthouse and quay of Augustus, a mosaic floor of fighting cocks in a private property, the sewers under the present rue Jean Jaures, the baptistry in Frejus Cathedral dates from the 5th c. and columns there are from Roman buildings.

No less than five public baths are known in the city, those of the Porte Dorée, the Plate-Forme, les Poiriers, Villeneuve (probably military) and on the Butte Saint-Antoine, three of which are outside the city walls.

A probable military or naval camp was excavated at Aiguières, Villeneuve near the ancient shore line. are incorporated in modern buildings, and also a 4th-century mausoleum at rue de La Tourrache. The remains of a suburban villa are at La Rose des Sables. Roman road bridges still exist at Cantonniers and at Esclapes (with three arches), a fulling mill at Arsenal, and a necropolis in Sainte-Brigitte and fishponds on the coast at Saint-Aygulf.

Aqueduct
The aqueduct is 42 km long and runs for 1.8 km on bridges and 500m on walls. Large parts of the aqueduct are still well preserved.

Roman port
An archaeological campaign in July 2005 revealed a portion of ancient rocky coast which showed it was almost one kilometre further inland than current estimates. In the middle of the 1st century AD at the time of the creation of Forum Iulii, this coastline was a narrow band of approximately 100m wide at the south of the Butte Saint-Antoine.
Further recent archaeology has revealed much information on the ancient port. A Triton monument was discovered at the entrance to the harbour. This statue and the remains of a Roman building at the end of the eastern quay nearby, shows this site to be a lighthouse.
Two lighthouses were constructed on the quays and a third assisted mariners in locating the harbour's sea entrance. The third, situated on the Île du Lion de Mer, would have been the primary beacon that ships would have navigated toward. As ships approached the harbour, the Triton lighthouse on the northern side of the channel into the harbour and the other lighthouse on the southern side would have marked the entrance and thus provided safe passage into the harbour.

Post-Roman history

Between the 7th and the 9th centuries, Muslim invaders repeatedly raided the city. The sea encroached on the land while invasions by the Muslims and pirates left the monuments in ruin. By the 10th century there was very little left of the colony, mostly rubble. Sea-borne silt clogged up the port and led to the formation of a huge swampy plain, which then separated the village from the sea.

Napoleon landed at Frejus on 9 October 1799, returning from Egypt in order to ostensibly defend the French Directory in Paris.

During the First World War Fréjus became the main centre for hivernage (wintering) for the Senegalese Tirailleurs. The town also contained segregated hospitals with images of African village life painted on the walls.

Geography

As a backdrop there is the Massif de l'Esterel.

Demographics

Politics
In 2014, David Rachline of the National Front (later renamed National Rally) was elected Mayor of Fréjus.

Economy
Fréjus is a resort town  which hosts three to four times as many people as its regular inhabitants over the summer.
It organises several fairs throughout the year; there is the pottery fair and the Bravade amongst its Roman and Gothic architecture with the 'old tile' roof tops and tinted walls. 
Port Fréjus which has a capacity of 750 moorings, is surrounded by beautiful fine sandy beaches. There is an annual 'Roc d'Azur' mountain bike event.

Transport
The Fréjus railway station offers connections to Saint-Raphaël, Les Arcs and Cannes and a few other regional destinations. Long distance destinations are accessible from the nearby Saint-Raphaël-Valescure station. The A8 autoroute connects Fréjus with Aix-en-Provence and Nice.

Climate
Fréjus has a hot-summer mediterranean climate (Köppen climate classification: Csa).

Twin towns and sister cities

Fréjus is twinned with:
 Fredericksburg, Virginia, United States
 Triberg, Germany
 Dumbéa, New Caledonia
 Paola, Italy
 Tabarka, Tunisia

Notable people

Cornelius Gallus (ca.70–26 BC), a Roman poet, orator and politician.
Gnaeus Julius Agricola (AD 40–93) a Roman governor of the province of Britain.
St. Maximus (died 460), Abbot at Lerins and Bishop of Frejus 
Marc-Antoine Désaugiers (1742–1793) & Marc-Antoine Madeleine Désaugiers (1772–1827) French composers 
Emmanuel Joseph Sieyès (1748–1836), known as Abbé Sieyès, French Revolution theorist and author of What is the Third Estate?.
Patrick Salameh (born 1957), a French criminal and serial killer.
Belinda Carlisle (born 1958), American singer, musician & author; partly lived here 1994-2017.
Casey Legler (born 1977) a French-American writer, restaurateur, model and former Olympic swimmer.
Anna Mouglalis (born 1978) a French actress and model.
David Rachline (born 1987) politician and mayor of Fréjus from March 2014

Sport 
Odiah Sidibe (born 1970) a French sprint athlete of Guinean descent
Yoann Richomme (born 1983), a French navigator, sailor and yacht skipper.
Adil Rami (born 1985) a footballer with about 450 club caps and 36 for France
Marc Andreu (born 1985), rugby union player
Kévin Constant (born 1987), a footballer with 228 club caps and 24 for Guinea
Anthony Modeste, (born 1988) a French footballer with over 400 club caps
Layvin Kurzawa (born 1992), a footballer with over 200 club caps and 13 for France

See also
Bishopric of Fréjus
Malpasset
Communes of the Var department

References

External links

 
 Official website (in French)
 Frejus website
 Forum Julii in 3D
 Fréjus la plate-forme
 Tourism website (in French)
 Port of Frejus Marina
 Photo of Fréjus Cathedral

Communes of Var (department)
French Riviera
People from Fréjus
Roman harbors in France
Var communes articles needing translation from French Wikipedia